Astragalus tricholobus is a species of milkvetch in the family Fabaceae. It is found in Greater Khorasan region of Iran.

References

tricholobus